

V09A Central nervous system

V09AA Technetium (99mTc) compounds
V09AA01 Technetium (99mTc) exametazime
V09AA02 Technetium (99mTc) bicisate

V09AB Iodine (123I) compounds
V09AB01 Iodine iofetamine (123I)
V09AB02 Iodine iolopride (123I)
V09AB03 Iodine ioflupane (123I)

V09AX Other central nervous system diagnostic radiopharmaceuticals
V09AX01 Indium (111In) pentetic acid
V09AX03 Iodine (124I) 2β-carbomethoxy-3β-(4-iodophenyl)-tropane
V09AX04 Flutemetamol (18F)
V09AX05 Florbetapir (18F)
V09AX06 Florbetaben (18F)
V09AX07 Flortaucipir (18F)

V09B Skeleton

V09BA Technetium (99mTc) compounds
V09BA01 Technetium (99mTc) oxidronic acid
V09BA02 Technetium (99mTc) medronic acid
V09BA03 Technetium (99mTc) pyrophosphate
V09BA04 Technetium (99mTc) butedronic acid

V09C Renal system

V09CA Technetium (99mTc) compounds
V09CA01 Technetium (99mTc) pentetic acid
V09CA02 Technetium (99mTc) succimer
V09CA03 Technetium (99mTc) mertiatide
V09CA04 Technetium (99mTc) gluceptate
V09CA05 Technetium (99mTc) gluconate
V09CA06 Technetium (99mTc) ethylenedicysteine

V09CX Other renal system diagnostic radiopharmaceuticals
V09CX01 Sodium iodohippurate (123I)
V09CX02 Sodium iodohippurate (131I)
V09CX03 Sodium iothalamate (125I)
V09CX04 Chromium (51Cr) edetate

V09D Hepatic and reticulo endothelial system

V09DA Technetium (99mTc) compounds
V09DA01 Technetium (99mTc) disofenin
V09DA02 Technetium (99mTc) etifenin
V09DA03 Technetium (99mTc) lidofenin
V09DA04 Technetium (99mTc) mebrofenin
V09DA05 Technetium (99mTc) galtifenin

V09DB Technetium (99mTc), particles and colloids
V09DB01 Technetium (99mTc) nanocolloid
V09DB02 Technetium (99mTc) microcolloid
V09DB03 Technetium (99mTc) millimicrospheres
V09DB04 Technetium (99mTc) tin colloid
V09DB05 Technetium (99mTc) sulfur colloid
V09DB06 Technetium (99mTc) rheniumsulfide colloid
V09DB07 Technetium (99mTc) phytate

V09DX Other hepatic and reticulo endothelial system diagnostic radiopharmaceuticals
V09DX01 Selenium (75Se) tauroselcholic acid

V09E Respiratory system

V09EA Technetium (99mTc) inhalants
V09EA01 Technetium (99mTc) pentetic acid
V09EA02 Technetium (99mTc) technegas
V09EA03 Technetium (99mTc) nanocolloid

V09EB Technetium (99mTc) particles for injection
V09EB01 Technetium (99mTc) macrosalb
V09EB02 Technetium (99mTc) microspheres

V09EX Other respiratory system diagnostic radiopharmaceuticals
V09EX01 Krypton (81mKr) gas
V09EX02 Xenon (127Xe) gas
V09EX03 Xenon (133Xe) gas

V09F Thyroid

V09FX Various thyroid diagnostic radiopharmaceuticals
V09FX01 Technetium (99mTc) pertechnetate
V09FX02 Sodium iodide (123I)
V09FX03 Sodium iodide (131I)
V09FX04 Sodium iodide (124I)

V09G Cardiovascular system

V09GA Technetium (99mTc) compounds
V09GA01 Technetium (99mTc) sestamibi
V09GA02 Technetium (99mTc) tetrofosmin
V09GA03 Technetium (99mTc) teboroxime
V09GA04 Technetium (99mTc) human albumin
V09GA05 Technetium (99mTc) furifosmin
V09GA06 Technetium (99mTc) stannous agent labelled cells
V09GA07 Technetium (99mTc) apcitide

V09GB Iodine (125I) compounds
V09GB01 Fibrinogen (125I)
V09GB02 Iodine (125I) human albumin

V09GX Other cardiovascular system diagnostic radiopharmaceuticals
V09GX01 Thallium (201Tl) chloride
V09GX02 Indium (111In) imciromab
V09GX03 Chromium (51Cr) chromate labelled cells
V09GX04 Rubidium (82Rb) chloride
V09GX05 Ammonia (13N)

V09H Inflammation and infection detection

V09HA Technetium (99mTc) compounds
V09HA01 Technetium (99mTc) human immunoglobulin
V09HA02 Technetium (99mTc) exametazime labelled cells
V09HA03 Technetium (99mTc) antigranulocyte antibody
V09HA04 Technetium (99mTc) sulesomab

V09HB Indium (111In) compounds
V09HB01 Indium (111In) oxinate labelled cells
V09HB02 Indium (111In) tropolonate labelled cells

V09HX Other diagnostic radiopharmaceuticals for inflammation and infection detection
V09HX01 Gallium (67Ga) citrate

V09I Tumour detection

V09IA Technetium (99mTc) compounds
V09IA01 Technetium (99mTc) antiCarcinoEmbryonicAntigen antibody
V09IA02 Technetium (99mTc) antimelanoma antibody
V09IA03 Technetium (99mTc) pentavalent succimer
V09IA04 Technetium (99mTc) votumumab
V09IA05 Technetium (99mTc) depreotide
V09IA06 Technetium (99mTc) arcitumomab
V09IA07 Technetium (99mTc) hynic-octreotide
V09IA08 Technetium (99mTc) etarfolatide
V09IA09 Technetium (99mTc) tilmanocept

V09IB Indium (111In) compounds
V09IB01 Indium (111In) pentetreotide
V09IB02 Indium (111In) satumomab pendetide
V09IB03 Indium (111In) antiovariumcarcinoma antibody
V09IB04 Indium (111In) capromab pendetide

V09IX Other diagnostic radiopharmaceuticals for tumour detection
V09IX01 Iobenguane (123I)
V09IX02 Iobenguane (131I)
V09IX03 Iodine (125I) CC49-monoclonal antibody
V09IX04 Fludeoxyglucose (18F)
V09IX05 Fluorodopa (18F)
V09IX06 Sodium fluoride (18F)
V09IX07 Fluorocholine (18F)
V09IX08 Fluoroethylcholine (18F)
V09IX09 Gallium (68Ga) edotreotide
V09IX10 Fluoroethyl-L-tyrosine (18F)
V09IX11 Fluoroestradiol (18F)
V09IX12 Fluciclovine (18F)
V09IX13 Methionine (11C)
V09IX14 Gallium (68Ga) gozetotide
V09IX15 Copper (64Cu) dotatate
V09IX16 Piflufolastat (18F)
V09IX17 PSMA-1007 (18F)

V09X Other diagnostic radiopharmaceuticals

V09XA Iodine (131I) compounds
V09XA01 Iodine (131I) norcholesterol
V09XA02 Iodocholesterol (131I)
V09XA03 Iodine (131I) human albumin

V09XX Various diagnostic radiopharmaceuticals
V09XX01 Cobalt (57Co) cyanocobalamine
V09XX02 Cobalt (58Co) cyanocobalamine
V09XX03 Selenium (75Se) norcholesterol
V09XX04 Ferric (59Fe) citrate

References

V09
Medicinal radiochemistry